KXCM 96.3 FM is a radio station licensed to Joshua Tree, California.  The station broadcasts a country music format and is owned by Copper Mountain Broadcasting Company.

References

External links
KXCM's official website

 

XCM
Country radio stations in the United States